Major-General Vivian Wakefield Street,  (19124 April 1970) was a British Army officer who commanded the 3rd Infantry Division for a period during the 1960s.

Military career
Educated at Wellington College, Berkshire, and the Royal Military College, Sandhurst, Street was commissioned into the Devonshire Regiment in 1932. He served as an intelligence officer with the 14th Infantry Brigade in Palestine during the Arab revolt in 1938 for which tour he received the MC. He also served in the Second World War as a general staff officer before becoming the officer in charge of the beach at Port Raphtis during Allied evacuation of Greece in 1941. After that he served with the 1st Special Air Service Regiment and carried out raids behind enemy lines in North Africa before being captured by the Italians and then escaping from a torpedoed Italian submarine. In 1944 he was made second-in-command of the Maclean Mission to Yugoslavia.

He was appointed commander of the parachute brigade of the Territorial Army in 1954, deputy director of staff duties at the War Office in 1956 and military adviser to the King of Jordan in 1959. He went on to be general officer commanding 3rd Division in 1961 before retiring in 1963.

In retirement he became chairman of the Save the Children Fund. He was also appeal director of the British Cardiac Society.

Family
Street was married to Annette Mary Lever Crean in 1945.

References

1912 births
1970 deaths
British Army major generals
British Army personnel of World War II
British military personnel of the 1936–1939 Arab revolt in Palestine
Companions of the Order of St Michael and St George
Commanders of the Order of the British Empire
Companions of the Distinguished Service Order
Devonshire Regiment officers
English justices of the peace
Graduates of the Royal Military College, Sandhurst
Recipients of the Military Cross
People educated at Wellington College, Berkshire
Rifle Brigade officers
Special Air Service officers